UKPASS (UK Postgraduate Application and Statistical Service) was the UCAS (Universities and Colleges Admissions Service) postgraduate application service.

Location
UKPASS was operated from UCAS offices in Cheltenham, Gloucestershire.

History
UKPASS was offered by UCAS from 2007 to 1 June 2018.

Application process for students
UKPASS offered a course search facility for all postgraduate courses in the UK, and an application service to the institutions using UKPASS. Applications could be submitted online through the UKPASS website. Applicants could make up to ten applications,  with core data pre-populated from one application to the next. Applicants tracked the progress of their applications and replied to offers online.

The website gave general information about planning postgraduate study and detailed information on postgraduate finance, and many hints and links for international student applicants.

Application process for universities and colleges
UKPASS offered higher education institutions an off-the-shelf application management service.

Applications for postgraduate courses were also available through other UCAS services as follows:

 Postgraduate teaching qualifications - GTTR
 Postgraduate conservatoire music courses – CUKAS
 Postgraduate social work - UCAS

References

External links
 
 UCAS official site
 GTTR official site
 CUKAS official site

Higher education organisations based in the United Kingdom
Organisations based in Cheltenham
Postgraduate education
UCAS